The 16th Annual Petit Le Mans presented by Mazda was the 2013 edition of the Petit Le Mans automotive endurance race, held on October 16–19, 2013, at the Road Atlanta circuit in Braselton, Georgia, United States.  The  race was the final Round of the 2013 American Le Mans Series season, as well as the final event of the American Le Mans Series as a whole before the series is reborn as the United SportsCar Championship in 2014.  Rebellion Racing's Nick Heidfeld, Nicolas Prost, and Neel Jani won the team's second consecutive Petit Le Mans, a full six laps ahead of the P2 class winning Level 5 Motorsports Honda, who secured a championship for Scott Tucker with the victory.  The BAR1 Motorsports won the Prototype Challenge category, their third straight victory of the season.  Team Falken Tire Porsche held the GT class lead by less than a second at the finish, while Flying Lizard Motorsports won the GT Challenge category by a margin of six seconds.

Qualifying
The Rebellion Racing LMP1 car qualified on the pole.

Race

Race result
Class winners in bold.  Cars failing to complete 70% of their class winner's distance are marked as Not Classified (NC).

References

Petit Le Mans
Petit Le Mans
Petit Le Mans
Motorsport in Georgia (U.S. state)